The Red Romance Book: Tales of Knights, Dragons & High Adventure (or The Red Book of Romance) is a book of heroic tales and legends. It was edited by Andrew Lang with illustrations by Henry J. Ford, and published in London by Longmans, Green, and Co. in 1905. The tales were generally taken from sagas and chivalric romances such as The Story of Burnt Njal, The Faerie Queene, Don Quixote and Orlando Furioso. They are about such legendary characters as Bevis of Hampton, Huon of Bordeaux, Ogier the Dane and Guy of Warwick. Some are literary fantasies, while others, such as the story of El Cid, have a basis in historical fact.

Contents
The 1905 edition of the book included:

How William of Palermo was carried off by the Werwolf
The Disenchantment of the Werwolf
The Slaying of Hallgerda's Husbands
The Death of Gunnar
Njal's Burning
The Lady of Solace
Una and the Lion
How the Red Cross Knight slew the Dragon
Amys and Amyle
The Tale of the Cid
The Knight of the Sorrowful Countenance
The Adventure of the Two Armies who turned out to be Flocks of Sheep
The Adventure of the Bobbing Lights
The Helmet of Mambrino
How Don Quixote was Enchanted while guarding the Castle
Don Quixote's Home-coming
The Meeting of Huon and Oberon, King of the Fairies
How Oberon saved Huon
Havelok and Goldborough
Cupid and Psyche
Sir Bevis the Strong
Ogier the Dane
How the Ass became a Man again
Guy of Warwick
How Bradamante conquered the Wizard
The Ring of Bradamante
The Fulfilling of the Prophecy
The Knight of the Sun
How the Knight of the Sun rescued his Father

References

Works based on European myths and legends
British children's books
Children's short story collections
1905 short story collections
1905 children's books
Books about cats